Mickael Carreira (born Mickael Araújo Antunes on 3 April 1986) is a Portuguese pop singer and songwriter. He is most famous for his ballads and the romanticism of his songs made him one of the best selling artists in Portugal. In total, his albums were certified platinum nine times. Over the course of his career, Mickael has collaborated with such international artists as Anggun, Enrique Iglesias and Sebastián Yatra.

Mickael is the eldest son of the singer Tony Carreira and took his stage name from his father.

Biography 
Mickael Carreira is the son of the Portuguese singer Tony Carreira and Fernanda Araújo. His brother is the singer David Carreira and his younger sister Sara, who died in car accident, was also a celebrity and singer.

Mickael was born in the town of Dourdan belonging to the metropolitan area of Paris. He spent his childhood in France until his family decided to move to Portugal when he was 15. It was at that age that he began writing songs.

In 2001, Mickael made his concert debut as he sang together with his father in the Olympia Hall in Paris. By that time Mickael already had a musical background having attended a conservatory where he learnt to play the piano. In addition to that, Mickael took guitar lessons, his first teacher being his father. Upon graduating from Lycée français, Mickael started working in a studio recording songs. His first album, Mickael, was released in 2006 and was rapidly certified triple platinum. During his very first tour Mickael gave over 100 concerts.

In 2007, he received the Globo de Ouro award for "Revelation Artist in Music" Portuguese media describing his success as 'supersonic'.

In 2009, Mickael recorded his first duet collaborating with the Indonesian singer Anggun on the song Chama por me (Call My Name). In 2012, he released his 4th studio album Viver a Vida produced by Rudy Pérez and Julio Reyes Copello who worked with such artists as Jennifer Lopez, Beyoncé, Christina Aguilera, Pitbull, Ricky Martin, Marc Anthony and Nelly Furtado. In 2014, together with Enrique Iglesias, Mickael recorded the Portuguese version of the song Bailando, which became an instant hit in Portugal. Mickael's most recent album, Instinto, was released in 2016.

From 2014 to 2018 he was a coach on The Voice Portugal and had two wins: in 2015 with Deolinda Kinzimba and in 2016 with Fernando Daniel.

In 2015, Mickael launched his eponymous perfume, Mickael Carreira, in partnership with the German company LR Health & Beauty.

In addition to Portuguese and French, Mickael is fluent in Spanish. He released three singles in this language including Yo Puedo Esperar, one of the themes of the Mexican TV series Por siempre mi amor.

In 2017, Mickael recorded the song Ya Ya Ya together with the Colombian singer Sebastián Yatra.

In 2022, he served as a coach on the Portuguese version of The Voice Generations.

Personal life
Since 2012, Mickael's partner has been the presenter and actress Laura Figueiredo. In March 2017, they became parents to a daughter Beatriz to whom Mickael dedicated his song O teu lugar.

Discography

Studio albums 

Special album editions
2007: Mickael (Special Edition) – 1 CD + 1 DVD (15 tracks)
2007: Entre Nós (Special Edition) – 1 CD + 1 DVD (CD=14 tracks, DVD 6 tracks

Live albums

Singles

Tours
2007: 1ª digressão (meaning tour) 
2008: Tour Entre Nós 
2009: 3ª digressão
2010: 4ª digressão 
2011: 5ª digressão 
2012: Tour Viver a Vida
2015: Tour Bailando 
2016: M Tour – 10 Anos de Carreira

Interesting facts 

 Mickael is known as "the Portuguese Enrique Iglesias".
 As a kid, Mickael took singing lessons from the same teacher that taught Sebastián Yatra.

References

1986 births
Living people
People from Dourdan
Portuguese pop singers
21st-century Portuguese male singers